Bythiospeum geyeri is a species of very small freshwater snails that have an operculum, aquatic gastropod mollusks in the family Hydrobiidae.

The specific name geyeri is in honor of German zoologist David Geyer (1855-1932).

This species is endemic to Austria.

References

Hydrobiidae
Bythiospeum
Endemic fauna of Austria
Gastropods described in 1925
Taxonomy articles created by Polbot